China and Cameroon established bilateral relations on March 26, 1971. Cameroon is an adherent to the One China Policy.

Political relations

The People's Republic established relations with Cameroon on 26 of March 1971. In the 2000s, leading politicians paid state visits to and from each country; these included Cameroonian President Paul Biya's visit for a conference in 2006 and Hu Jintao's visit to Cameroon in 2007.

Chinese Foreign Minister, Wang Yi visited Cameroon on 12 January 2014.

Cameroon was one of 53 countries, that in June 2020, backed the Hong Kong national security law at the United Nations.

Economic development
Since the first Forum on China Africa Cooperation in 2000, Beijing has successfully delivered $2.4 billion in development finance to Cameroon. $87 million of that total falls under the OECD-DAC criteria for Official Development Assistance. Major projects executed by the Chinese government in Cameroon include:
Construction of the Kribi Deep Seaport funded by a FCFA 207,270 billion loan from the Exim Bank of China
A FCFA 243 billion loan from China Exim bank for construction of the Memve'ele hydroelectric Dam in Nyabizan

Construction of a malaria research center at Yaounde's Hospital of Gynecology, Obstetrics, and Pediatrics 
Yearly trade topped 854 million US dollars in 2008, before dropping to 813 million US dollars in 2009 due to the global recession.

Criticism
In the 2000s, some in Cameroon considered the economic relationship to be a form of neo-colonialism; this was mainly due to a perception that Chinese traders flooded the Cameroonian market with cheap but extremely fragile manufactured goods, which stymied the development of local industries.

References

Further reading 

 Amin, Julius A. (2015). "Sino-Cameroon Relations: A Foreign Policy of Pragmatism". African Studies Review. 58 (3): 171–189. .
 Anatole, Daka; Yijie, Wang; Liang, Hu; Vanessa, Mbajon Chimi Tuatsop (2021-12-01). "China-Cameroon Agricultural Cooperation: Challenges of Agricultural Development in Cameroon". Journal of African Foreign Affairs. 8 (3): 49–72. .
 Assembe-Mvondo, S; Cerutti, P O; Putzel, L; Eba'a Atyi, R (2016). "What Happens When Corporate Ownership Shifts to China? A Case Study on Rubber Production in Cameroon". The European Journal of Development Research. 28 (3): 465–478. . 
 Cabestan, Jean-Pierre (2015). "China–Cameroon relations: Fortunes and limits of an old political complicity". South African Journal of International Affairs. 22 (1): 67–91. . .
 De Prince Pokam, Hilaire; Hall, Jonathan (2011). "Chinese Medicine in Cameroon". China Perspectives. 3 (87): 51–58. .
 Khan, Sunday Aninpah; Baye, Francis Menjo (2008). "China-Africa Economic Relations: The Case of Cameroon". Report Submitted to the African Economic Research Consortium.
 Khan, Sunday A (2014). "The Emergence of China in Cameroon: Trade Impact and Evolution of Trade Configuration". In Moyo, Theresa (ed), Trade and Industrial Development in Africa: Rethinking Strategy and Policy, pp. 99-120. CODESRIA.
 Ndjio, B. (2014). "'Magic body' and 'cursed sex': Chinese sex workers as 'bitch-witches' in Cameroon". African Affairs. 113 (452): 370–386. . .
 Nguepjouo, Diderot (2017). "The spatialisation of China's presence in Cameroon: The case of the mining sector". The Extractive Industries and Society. 4 (3): 513–524. . .
 Nordtveit, Bjørn H. (2011). "An emerging donor in education and development: A case study of China in Cameroon". International Journal of Educational Development. 31 (2): 99–108. . .
 Tsounkeu, Martin (2011). Mapping Chinese development assistance in Africa: An analysis of the experiences of Cameroon. Harare: African Forum and Network on Debt and Development. .
 Vanessa, Mbajon (2019). "The Economic Cooperation between Cameroon and China: Hub on Infrastructure and Investment Projects 2007-2018". Journal of African Union Studies. 8 (3): 95–113. .
 Vanessa, Mbajon Chimi Tuatsop; Zou, Xiaolong (2020). "China's Foreign Aid to Cameroon: Perception from Non-Governmental Organizations 2007-2017". Journal of African Foreign Affairs. 7 (1): 49–70. .
 Weng, Lingfei; Margules, Chris (2022). "Challenges with formalizing artisanal and small-scale mining in Cameroon: Understanding the role of Chinese actors". The Extractive Industries and Society. 9: 101046. . .
 Weng, Lingfei; Sayer, Jeffrey A.; Xue, Lan (2017). "Will China redefine development patterns in Africa? Evidence from Cameroon". The Extractive Industries and Society. 4 (3): 506–512. . .

 
China
Bilateral relations of China